The Spain national U-17 basketball team (Spain Kids national basketball team), is the representative for Spain in international basketball competitions, and it is organized and run by the Spanish Basketball Federation. team represents Spain at the FIBA Under-17 World Championship.

World Cup

See also
Spanish Basketball Federation
Spain national youth basketball teams
Spain women's national under-17 basketball team

References

External links

U-17
Men's national under-17 basketball teams